Nakhon Si Thammarat International Airport (  is an airport serving Nakhon Si Thammarat, a town in Nakhon Si Thammarat province, Thailand.

History

The airport's first landing was on 1 December 1998 by Thai Airways and PBair from Bangkok.

Beginning in 1985, Nakhon Si Thammarat used Cha-ian Airport (Army Region 4) temporarily. Thai Airways flew from Surat Thani to Nakhon Si Thammarat on Short 360 aircraft. Nakhon Si Thammarat Airport then had Nok Air, Thai AirAsia, One-Two-Go as airlines. Thai Airways and PBair later suspended service.

In July 2008, the Department of Civil Aviation (Thailand) suspended the certificate of One Two Go (operated by Orient Thai Airlines) from 22 July to 15 September. One Two Go was then re-certified and their service was suspended to Nakhon Si Thammarat Airport.

Nakhon Si Thammarat Airport offers direct routes from Bangkok–Don Mueang with Nok Air, Thai AirAsia, and Thai Lion Air. The average number of flights is 7 per day.

As a result of the airport's growth, the Nakhon Si Thammarat Provincial Governor and Nakhon Si Thammarat Airport Director are working on including international flights, due to the potential for increased tourism and economic growth for the Nakhon Si Thammarat province. The initiative planned to extend the runway to 2,600 meters (8,530 feet).

On 12 July 2013 Nakhon Si Thammarat Airport was published in Royal Thai Government Gazette to customs airport, No. 10/1 of Ministerial Regulation prescribed port or place, customs airport, border approval way, and customs ACT 2553. Dated 1 July 2013 by Kittiratt Na-Ranong, the Minister of Finance, which resulted in Nakhon Si Thammarat Airport qualifying to import and export international flights and goods.

Capacity
The airport is 14 km (8.69 miles) from the city center. It has an arrival terminal capacity of 188 people per hour and a departure terminal capacity of 215 people per hour. It has two Boeing 737 parking spaces, two ATR 72 parking spaces, and two helipad spaces. The airport spans 2,902,400 square meters (1,803 square miles).

The terminal building covers 7,985 square meters (26,197 square feet). The arrival terminal covers 375 square meters (1,230 square feet), while the departure terminal covers 375 square meters (1,230 square feet).

The flight capacity is 32/day. The passenger capacity is 2,504 passengers/day. Aircraft parking space is 17,000 square meters (85 x 200 meters). The runway covers 45 x 2,100 meters (147.6 x 6,889 feet).

Airlines and destinations

Passenger

Statistics

References

External links

 
 Nakhon Si Thammarat Airport Homepage
 
 

Airports in Thailand
Buildings and structures in Nakhon Si Thammarat province
Airports established in 1998
1998 establishments in Thailand